Star Radio Network (also known as Hunt Broadcasting) is a series of radio stations in Texas and Louisiana.  It is owned by Leon Hunt.

Radio affiliates
Radio affiliates for Star Radio Network are KIVY licensed in Crockett, Texas, KMVL licensed in Madisonville, Texas, and KJVC-FM licensed in Mansfield, Louisiana.

External links
 KIVY Website
 KMVL Website
 KJVC Website

References

American radio networks
Radio broadcasting companies of the United States